Pedro Pareja Duque (born 28 April 1989), commonly known as Pedrito, is a Spanish footballer who plays for CE Mataró as a forward.

Football career
Born in Canet de Mar, Barcelona, Catalonia, Pedrito joined Málaga CF in the summer of 2007 from amateurs UE Vilassar de Mar. He spent the vast majority of his spell with the Andalusians with the reserves in Tercera División, scoring 14 goals in his second year as the team eventually failed to promote in the playoffs.

Pedrito made his first-team debut on 13 December 2009, coming on as a substitute for Fernando in the last minutes of a 1–1 away draw against Real Valladolid. He made a further two La Liga appearances during that season, totalling 61 minutes.

In June 2010, Pedrito's contract expired and was not renewed by Málaga. Subsequently, he returned to his native region and joined fourth level club UE Llagostera.

From 2013 to 2017, Pedrito competed in the Cypriot First Division.

Club statistics

References

External links

1989 births
Living people
People from Canet de Mar
Sportspeople from the Province of Barcelona
Spanish footballers
Footballers from Catalonia
Association football forwards
La Liga players
Segunda División B players
Tercera División players
UE Vilassar de Mar players
Atlético Malagueño players
Málaga CF players
UE Costa Brava players
CF Reus Deportiu players
CE Mataró players
Cypriot First Division players
Doxa Katokopias FC players
Nea Salamis Famagusta FC players
Spanish expatriate footballers
Expatriate footballers in Cyprus
Spanish expatriate sportspeople in Cyprus